Zorbeg Ebralidze (born 20 September 1944), is a former Georgian football defender and coach.

Ebralidze was born in Lanchkhuti, Georgian SSR. He played for FC Dinamo Tbilisi and Soviet Union National Team. He also played for a year for FC Guria Lanchkhuti and FC Torpedo Kutaisi. Among his successes as a player were helping to win the Soviet Cup FC Dinamo Tbilisi in 1976.

Now Zorbeg Ebralidze coached FC Norchi Dinamoeli.

Honours
Soviet Cup Champion: 1976Soviet Top League Bronze prize winner: 1978

External links
 Player profile at Football.lg.ua
 Magyarfutball (in Hungarian)

Association football midfielders
Footballers from Georgia (country)
Football managers from Georgia (country)
Footballers from Tbilisi
FC Guria Lanchkhuti players
FC Torpedo Kutaisi players
FC Dinamo Tbilisi players
Soviet Top League players
Soviet footballers
Soviet football managers
FC Norchi Dinamo Tbilisi managers
Living people
1944 births